Thor Moxnes (7 January 1924 – 28 September 2006) was a Norwegian footballer. He played in five matches for the Norway national football team in 1948.

References

External links
 

1924 births
2006 deaths
Norwegian footballers
Norway international footballers
Place of birth missing
Association footballers not categorized by position